972 may refer to

 The number 972; see 900 (number)
 The year 972 AD
 List of state leaders in 972
 972, the country code of Israel; see Telephone numbers in Israel
 +972 Magazine, an Israeli-Palestinian web magazine
 972 area code in the United States, which covers the Dallas, Texas area: see area codes 214, 469, 972, and 945
 972 Cohnia, a minor planet orbiting the Sun
 972 Fifth Avenue or Payne Whitney House, a historic building in Manhattan, New York City
 NGC 972, a spiral galaxy; see List of NGC objects (1–1000)
 United Nations Security Council Resolution 972